Ali Kanna Sulayman (born 1945) is a Libyan lieutenant general of Tuareg origin. He was the commander of Muammar Gaddafi's southern forces in the First Libyan Civil War. After the end of the Fezzan campaign, he fled to Agadez and helped other Gaddafi loyalists, most notably air force commander Ali Sharif Al-Rifi, escape to Niger. 

In 2013, he returned to the Fezzan region of Libya. He was subsequently involved in mediating the Ubari conflict. In 2015, he participated in negotiation in Doha to end the conflict between the Tuareg and the Toubou.

In February 2019, Prime Minister of the Government of National Accord, Fayez al-Sarraj, appointed Kanna as commander of the southern (Sabha) military zone.

Biography 
In 2004, Kanna was appointed by Muammar Gaddafi to lead the newly formed Maghawir Brigade. Based in Ubari, this brigade consisted of 3,000 Sahelian Tuaregs from Niger and Mali and thus were accused of being mercenaries in the First Libyan Civil War. After the fall of the Gaddafi regime, some members of the Maghawir Brigade joined the National Movement for the Liberation of Azawad in Mali.

After the fall of Tripoli on August 28, 2011, Bani Walid, Sirte, and Kanna's southern forces in Sebha were the only major cities still controlled by the Gaddafi regime. On September 6, 2011, a large convoy of pro-Gaddafi Tuareg fighters in Kanna's southern battalion crossed into Algeria before entering Niger. Kanna was rumored to be part of this convoy, amidst rumor that Gaddafi himself and his son Saif al-Islam would catch up with this convoy and join Kanna en route to Burkina Faso.

In 2013, Kanna reportedly returned to Libya from his exile in Niger. After playing a role in mediating the Ubari conflict between the Tuareg and Toubou in 2015, Kanna called for the creation of a multi-ethnic army of the south (Fezzan army) that espoused Gaddafi's Jamahiriya ideology on May 17, 2016.

On September 1, 2016, Kanna held a ceremony in Ghat to commemorate the 47th anniversary of Gaddafi's al-Fateh Revolution.

In October 2016, officers controlling the southern Fezzan region unilaterally appointed Kanna as their commander without consulting Khalifa Haftar. After his appointment, Kanna claimed that his forces would not be involved in politics and called for the unification of Libya between the Tripoli-based Government of National Accord and the Tobruk-based House of Representatives. He also stated that the formation of “Libyan Arab Armed Forces in South Libya" was an internal matter for the southern region.

In May 2017, Kanna's forces peacefully took control of the El Sharara oil field from Misrata's 13th Brigade militia.

In June 2017, Saif al-Islam Gaddafi was rumored to have joined Kanna's forces in Ubari after his release by Zintan.

In July 2017, Kanna went to Algeria to meet with Algerian Minister of Foreign Affair, Abdelkader Messahel. Kanna's Tuareg forces control the Ghat region bordering Algeria. Kanna allegedly has close ties to Algerian intelligence.

In January 2019, as Khalifa Haftar's Libyan National Army launched its Southern Libya offensive in the Second Libyan Civil War, Kanna called for the Government of National Accord to dissuade Haftar from destabilizing the Fezzan region. In February 2019, Kanna was appointed by Fayez al-Sarraj as commander of the Fezzan region. His role was to defend the El Sharara oil field from being taken over by Haftar and to unite the Tuareg and Toubou militias against Haftar. Kanna's appointment backfired as local public opinion appeared to strongly support Haftar's takeover and most of Fezzan, including Sabha and the El Sharara oil field, fell to Haftar. In November 2019, Kanna criticized southern fighters who supported Haftar's Western Libya campaign and called on them to withdraw immediately.

Kanna advocated for the unification of the Libyan armed forces while attending the graduation ceremony of the Ubari Military Training Center on September 28, 2022.

References 

Living people
Libyan generals
People of the First Libyan Civil War
Year of birth missing (living people)